John Carl 'J.C.' Kuessner, Jr. is a Democratic Party former member of the Missouri House of Representatives, representing District 152 since 2002. He served as Assistant Minority Floor Leader. He was raised in Winona, Missouri.

External links
Missouri House of Representatives - J.C. Kuessner official MO House website
Project Vote Smart - Representative J.C. Kuessner (MO) profile
Follow the Money - J.C. Kuessner
2006 2004 2002 campaign contributions

Members of the Missouri House of Representatives
1942 births
Living people
People from Poplar Bluff, Missouri
People from Shannon County, Missouri
People from Eminence, Missouri